This list includes wars which have been named for their duration, either as the most common name or an alternative commonly used name. This table can be sorted by length or start-date.

Explanatory notes

See also

 Outline of war
 includes lists of wars

Named
Military historiography